Oklahoma State University–Oklahoma City (OSU-OKC) is a public university in Oklahoma City, Oklahoma. It is part of the Oklahoma State University System. Founded in 1961 as a branch of Oklahoma State University–Stillwater, its name changed from Oklahoma State University Technical Institute to its current designation in 1990.  The school offers more than 40 degrees and/or certificates. Classes are held weekdays and weeknights, on-campus, online and hybrid, with intersession courses available. The university is accredited by the Higher Learning Commission.

Academics 

The academic divisions at OSU-OKC include Agriculture Technologies & Business Administration, Health Sciences, Human Services, Initial College Studies, Liberal Arts, and Science, Technology, Engineering & Mathematics (STEM). OSU-OKC offers Bachelors,  and Associate degree as well as Certificate programs.

References

External links

 

Universities and colleges in Oklahoma City
Oklahoma State University
1961 establishments in Oklahoma